Universidad Del Pacífico – Ecuador : Escuela de Negocios (UPACIFICO) is an Ecuadorian non-profit private university.

It focuses on its students ability to undertake business, to turn initiatives into economic realities, to organize activities, to assure development and stability of business, to locate resources and employ effective methods of production, development of risk-management capabilities and a working knowledge of the economic and political environment are some of the areas of instruction offered to students.

Mission statement
"Contribute to the economic and social development  of the country, through the training of leading professionals with values, and aware of the transformation processes in which the world lives. Endowed with the skills to execute innovative initiatives that promote sustainable development, within an environment of excellence, cooperation and competitiveness."

History
The Fundación para el Desarrollo de la Cultura Empresarial was founded in 1992 as a non profit organization whose mission statement was "to rescue the business culture in Ecuador", by forming professional business leaders to strengthen this sector. In June 1994 the foundation started Escuela de Negocios Del Pacífico (Pacifico Business School) an academic institution.

In 1997, after the favorable acceptance of the National Council of Universities and Polytechnic Schools (CONUEP), today the Council for Higher Education (CES) formerly ( CONESUP), the Ecuadorian National Congress passed Law # 43, creating Universidad Del Pacífico – Escuela de Negocios, a non-profit private institution, specialized in developing entrepreneurs and professionals, with an international model of higher education and authorized to grant degrees at an undergraduate, and postgraduate level including continuous education, Masters and PhD levels.

Years of experience, the academic commitment of the founding business professionals of the university and its faculty resulted in the national and international recognition of the institution.

The university has three campuses at strategic development areas of the country – Quito, Guayaquil and Cuenca – with the purpose of reaching a national synergy and a contribution to the country's integration.

Locations
Guayaquil

Quito

Programs of study

Academic programs underwent reforms after a change in laws for Higher Education (LOES) and the Reglamento de Armonización de la Nomenclatura de Títulos (Regulation for the harmonization and nomenclature of degrees)

Undergraduate

Current

Before

Graduate Program

Current

Before

Certificate of Advanced Studies 
 Financial Management
 Strategic Marketing
 International Business
 Human Resource Development
 Stock Market Administration
 Customs Management
 Insurance Management

School of Applied Languages 
English Department
Spanish Department
European Languages Department
Asian Languages Department

International Programs
As of June 2009, the university had various international connections with different programs
 including:

Doctorates Honoris Causa

Emission of Doctorates Honoris Causa were restricted after 2009 due to a change in the National Law for Higher Education (Ley Organica de Educación Superior)

Recognitions
 Medalla al Mérito Educativo "Dr. Vicente Rocafuerte": 2022 (National Assembly)
 Medalla al Mérito Educativo "Dr. Vicente Rocafuerte": 2018 (National Assembly)
 Medalla al Mérito Educativo "Dr. Vicente Rocafuerte": 2008 (National Congress)
EDUNIVERSAL3 Palmes of Excellence - Excellent Business School with Reinforcing International Influence: 2008-2022 
Amity Global Academic Excellence Award: 2016
Mención de Honor "Marieta de Veintimilla": 2018
"Reconocimiento al Mérito Educativo". 2018 (Prefectura del Guayas) 
"Medalla Conmemorativa Bicentenario Guayaquil" 2022

Notable alumni

 
  Pablo Campana, Tennis Player, Former Minister of Commerce
  Danilo Rosero, Singer 
  Johanna Ballestero, Corporate Leader at Pharmaceutical Industry
  Efraín Ruales, Television Personality
  Claudia Schiess, Ecuadorian Model, Television and Social Media Personality
  Xavier Enderica, Swimmer, Former Minister of Sports, Former Governor of Azuay
  María Fernanda Rivadeneira Cuzco, lawyer and elected counsellor of the Council for Citizen Participation and Social Control

See also

List of universities in Ecuador

References

External links
upacifico.edu.ec, university's official website (in Spanish)
UNESCO University List Ecuador
EDUNIVERSAL Ranking Ecuador

Educational institutions established in 1997
Buildings and structures in Guayaquil
Private universities and colleges
Universities in Quito
1997 establishments in Ecuador
Universities in Ecuador